Jacob Augustus Knodell  (July 26, 1852 - October 26, 1887) was an American Major League Baseball player who played mainly catcher for the Brooklyn Atlantics of the National Association and the Milwaukee Grays of the National League.

References

External links

1852 births
19th-century baseball players
Major League Baseball catchers
Brooklyn Atlantics players
Milwaukee Grays players
Baseball players from New York City
London Tecumseh players
Pittsburgh Allegheny players
Bay City (minor league baseball) players
Trenton Trentonians players
Harrisburg Olympics players
1887 deaths
Burials at Cypress Hills Cemetery